Ondřej Čtvrtníček (born 17 June 1984) is a Czech footballer, who plays as a midfielder. He currently plays for MFK Skalica.

External links

1984 births
Living people
Czech footballers
Czech First League players
1. FC Slovácko players
1. HFK Olomouc players
Association football midfielders